The Sabah FK 2019–20 season was Sabah's second Azerbaijan Premier League season, and their third season in existence.

Season events
On 16 September, Elshad Ahmadov resigned as manager with Igor Ponomaryov taking over on an interim basis. On 26 November, Sabah announced that Željko Sopić had been appointed manager on an 18-month contract.

On 13 March 2020, the Azerbaijan Premier League was postponed due to the COVID-19 pandemic.

On 19 June 2020, the AFFA announced that the 2019–20 season had been officially ended without the resumption of the remains matches due to the escalating situation of the COVID-19 pandemic in Azerbaijan.

Squad

On loan

Transfers

In

Out

Loans out

Released

Friendlies

Competitions

Azerbaijan Premier League

Results summary

Results by round

Results

League table

Azerbaijan Cup

Squad statistics

Appearances and goals

|-
|colspan="14"|Players away from Sabah on loan:
|-
|colspan="14"|Players who left Sabah during the season:

|}

Goal scorers

Clean sheets

Disciplinary record

References

Sabah FC (Azerbaijan) seasons
Azerbaijani football clubs 2019–20 season